Beyk Pulad (also Romanized as Beyk Pūlād and Beyg Pūlād; also known as Bak Pūlād) is a village in Jargalan Rural District, Raz and Jargalan District, Bojnord County, North Khorasan Province, Iran. At the 2006 census, its population was 2,441, in 515 families.

References 

Populated places in Bojnord County